George Thorpe (baptized January 1, 1576 – March 22, 1622 at Berkeley Hundred), was a noted landowner, Member of Parliament, distiller, educator and major investor in early colonial companies in the Americas. George Thorpe was born at Wanswell Court, the family estate in Gloucestershire, England.

Early life
He was the eldest son of Nicholas and Mary Wilkes Thorpe. On February 20, 1598 he matriculated at the Middle Temple in London, where he likely studied law. He recordedly served as a justice of the peace for Gloucestershire from about 1605 to 1618.

On July 11, 1600, George Thorpe and Margaret Porter were married. Although her date of death is unknown, she was buried at Berkeley Church on March 10, 1610. The couple had no surviving children. Less than a year later, on February 21, 1611, George Thorpe and Margaret Harris married. The couple had five children, of whom at least two, William and John, lived to maturity.

In 1614, George Thorpe represented Portsmouth in a short parliamentary session called the Addled Parliament. Also by this date, George Thorpe had become a major investor in the Virginia Company of London, the East India Company, Somers Isles Company and the Berkeley Hundred.

Virginia Colony
"He was related both in blood and by marriage with some of the distinguished men of the Jamestown colony, and among others with Sir Thomas Dale. The Thorpe family was a prominent one and our subject became a gentleman pensioner, a gentleman of the privy chamber of the king and a member of parliament from Portsmouth. He was a man of strong religious feeling and became greatly interested in the problem of the conversion of the savages with which his countrymen were newly coming into contact in the new world. He formed a partnership with Sir William Throckmorton, John Smith of Nibley, Richard Berkeley and others for the ownership and conduct of a private plantation in Virginia, and selling his English property, he set sail for Virginia, where he arrived March, 1620. He was appointed deputy to govern the college land and to have three hundred acres and ten tenants, and on June 28, 1620, he was made a member of the council."
In March 1620, George Thorpe sailed from Bristol for Virginia. He was later made a deputy in charge of 10,000 acres of land to be set aside for a university and Indian school and is also named to the governor's Council of Virginia. Shortly afterwards, plantation investors removed Captain John Woodlief as commander of Berkeley Hundred and replace him with George Thorpe and William Tracy.

Educator
In 1620, George Thorpe was made the deputy or superintendent in charge of land set aside by the Virginia Company of London for a college and for a school for Native Americans in the colony. The land was on the north bank of the James river where there was a proposed college at Henricus in the "Shire of Henricus", supported by the Church of England. An article describing the "College of Henricus" says: "The first university in America actually was chartered in 1618, and slated for construction on 10,000 riverfront acres in what is now Varina. Enthusiasm for the project ran high in England. London Company records from the time state that King James authorized bishops and clergy in England to make a collection of 15,000 pounds “for the college and university of Virginia.” Among early donations to the cause were 1,500 pounds, altar cloths, books, communion silver, a damask tablecloth and “a carpet of crimson velvet.”

When George Thorpe was killed in 1622, the plans for the school were never revived. In 2000, the County of Henrico set up a marker showing the site of the proposed school. The inscription says: "On April 3, 1620, The London Company hired George Thorpe to manage the land and tenants for the proposed "university and college" on 11,000 acres on the north bank of the James River above Henrico Town. The agricultural activities of the tenants supported the school, which was established to Christianize American Indian children and introduce them to English culture. Indian attackers killed Thorpe and 347 Virginia colonists on March 22, 1622 at the beginning of the Anglo-Powhatan Wars. The event brought an end to early efforts to establish a university and college in Henrico."

The College of William & Mary asserts an historical connection to the early attempt to form a college in Henricus. In 1992, "Henricus Colledge" (sic) was revived and dedicated to "Research and Continuing Education on the Judeo-Christian principles fundamental to the Planning, Planting and Purposeful Development of American "Liberty Under Law."

Bourbon Whiskey
George Thorpe is credited with the distillation of the first batch of whiskey made from corn. This is the ancestor of all corn-made moonshine and Bourbon Whiskey. In the fall of 1620, George Thorpe was said to have distilled a batch of corn beer, and thus made the first samples of what would later become Bourbon whiskey. In a letter, dated December 19, 1620 to John Smyth of Nibley, George Thorpe reassures his partner of his good health and mentions a "soe good drinke of Indian corne" he has distilled.

Death
On March 22, 1622, George Thorpe was killed at Berkeley Hundred in one of many coordinated Indian attacks led by Opechancanough against James River plantations, in what is known as the Indian Massacre of 1622.

References

Bibliography
 Fausz, J. Frederick. "George Thorpe, Nemattanew, and the Powhatan Uprising of 1622." Virginia Cavalcade 28 (1979): 110–117.
 Gethyn-Jones, Eric. George Thorpe and the Berkeley Company: A Gloucestershire Enterprise in Virginia. Gloucester, England: Alan Sutton, 1982.
 McCartney, Martha W. Virginia immigrants and adventurers, 1607-1635: a biographical dictionary. Baltimore: Genealogical Pub. Co., 2007. .
 Morey, Dennis A. J. George Thorpe: Virginia's First Schoolmaster. [Chesterfield, Va.]: Henricus Foundation, 1999. 
 Thorpe, Margaret Harris, and John Smyth. Letter, [1622] June 30, to [John] Smith. 1622. Abstract: Asks that Smith continue a loan of money to her as agreed by Smith and George Thorpe (partners in Berkeley Hundred [Va.]).
 Waterhouse, Edward, Henry Briggs, Robert Milbourne, and George Eld. A Declaration of the State of the Colony and Affaires in Virginia.: With a Relation of the Barbarous Massacre in the Time of Peace and League, Treacherously Executed by the Natiue Infidels Vpon the English, the 22 of March Last. Together with the Names of Those That Were Then Massacred; That Their Lawfull Heyres, by This Notice Giuen, May Take Order for the Inheriting of Their Lands and Estates in Virginia. An a Treatise Annexed. London: Imprinted by G. Eld. for R. Mylbourne, 1622. 
 Wolfe, Brendan. "George Thorpe (bap. 1576–1622)." Encyclopedia Virginia. Virginia Foundation for the Humanities, 15 Sep. 2014. Web. 6 Jun. 2015. Retrieved from http://www.EncyclopediaVirginia.org/Thorpe_George_bap_1576-1622.

1622 deaths
English MPs 1614
English explorers
English explorers of North America
Jamestown, Virginia
Explorers of the United States
Henrico County, Virginia
Bourbon whiskey